Symphony No. 7, Odisséia da paz (Peace Odyssey) is a composition by the Brazilian composer Heitor Villa-Lobos, written in 1945. A performance lasts about 30 minutes.

History
Villa-Lobos composed his Seventh Symphony in Rio de Janeiro in 1945 for a competition in Detroit. As required by the rules of the competition, it was submitted anonymously, using the pseudonym A. Caramurú. It was not awarded a prize in the competition. It was first performed in London on 27 March 1949 by the London Symphony Orchestra, conducted by the composer.

The symphony, written shortly after the surrender of Germany on 7 May 1945, is subtitled "Odisséia da paz" (Peace Odyssey). The second edition of the official Villa-Lobos catalogue, however, at one place gives "Odisséia de uma raça" (the title of an unrelated symphonic poem from 1953), together with a short programmatic description:

Instrumentation
The symphony is written for an orchestra consisting of 2 piccolos, 3 flutes, 3 oboes, cor anglais, 3 clarinets, 2 bass clarinets, 3 bassoons, 2 contrabassoons, 6 horns, 4 trumpets, 4 trombones, tuba, timpani, tam-tam, cymbals, triangle, pandeira, chocalho, glockenspiel, reco reco, side drum, large snare drum, bass drum, Novachord, xylophone, vibraphone, celesta, 2 harps, piano, and strings.

Analysis
The symthony has four movemenc:
 Allegro vivace
Lento
 Sčerzo (Allegro non troppo)
 Allegro presiso

References

Cited sources

Further reading
 Béhague, Gerard. 1994. Villa-Lobos: The Search for Brazil's Musical Soul. Austin: Institute of Latin American Studies, University of Texas at Austin, 1994. .
 Enyart, John William. 1984. "The Symphonies of Heitor Villa-Lobos". PhD diss. Cincinnati: University of Cincinnati.
 Peppercorn, Lisa M. 1991. Villa-Lobos: The Music: An Analysis of His Style, translated by Stefan de Haan. London: Kahn & Averill; White Plains, NY: Pro/Am Music Resources Inc.  (Kahn & Averill); .
 Salles, Paulo de Tarso. 2009. Villa-Lobos: processos composicionais. Campinas, SP: Editora da Unicamp. .

Symphonies by Heitor Villa-Lobos
1945 compositions